Ralph Irvine Sasse (July 19, 1889 – October 16, 1954) was an American football player, coach, college athletics administrator, and United States Army officer.  He served as the head football coach at the United States Military Academy from 1930 to 1932 and at Mississippi State College, now Mississippi State University, from 1935 to 1937, compiling a career college football record of 45–15–4.

Biography

Born near Wilmington, Delaware in 1889, Sasse attended the United States Military Academy, graduating in 1916.  After graduating from West Point, Sasse was assigned to the cavalry, and while serving the United States in World War I, he rose to the rank of Major and commanded the 301st Tank Battalion.

After World War I, he returned to his alma mater in 1924 as a mathematics instructor and was appointed head coach in 1929. Later, in 1935, Sasse joined the Mississippi State College staff as a science instructor and head football coach of the State College Maroons. After leading Mississippi State College to a 20–10–2 record in three years and an appearance in the 1937 Orange Bowl, Sasse stunned the students and players by resigning from his head coach's duties, following a doctor's orders after a sudden nervous breakdown. Upon leaving the coaching ranks, Sasse become the athletic director at Pennsylvania Military College, Chester in 1941.

Sasse died October 16, 1954 in Rehoboth Beach, Delaware. He was buried at Arlington National Cemetery.

Head coaching record

References

External links
 Arlington National Cemetery

1889 births
1954 deaths
Army Black Knights football coaches
Army Black Knights football players
Mississippi State Bulldogs athletic directors
Mississippi State Bulldogs football coaches
Mississippi State University faculty
Widener Pride athletic directors
United States Army personnel of World War I
United States Army officers
United States Military Academy faculty
Players of American football from Wilmington, Delaware
Burials at Arlington National Cemetery